The men's doubles wheelchair tennis tournament at the 2020 Paralympic Games in Tokyo was held at the Ariake Tennis Park in Kōtō, Tokyo from 28 August to 3 September 2021.

Defending champions Stéphane Houdet and Nicolas Peifer from France extended their title. In the golden final they defeated first seeds Alfie Hewett and Gordon Reid from the United Kingdom, 7–5, 0–6, 7–6.

Seeds 
  /  (final, Silver medalists)
  /  (gold medalists)
  /  (semifinals)
  /  (semifinals, bronze medalists)
  /  (quarterfinals)
  /  (quarterfinals)
  /  (quarterfinals)
  /  (quarterfinals)

Draw

Finals

Top half

Bottom half

References 

Wheelchair tennis at the 2020 Summer Paralympics